The Arab League has 22 member states. It was founded in Cairo in March 1945 with six members: the Kingdom of Egypt, Kingdom of Iraq, Lebanon, Saudi Arabia, Syrian Republic, and Transjordan (Jordan from 1949). North Yemen (later becoming Yemen) joined  on 5 May 1945. Membership increased during the second half of the 20th century. Seven countries have observer status. The headquarters are located in Cairo, Egypt.

List of current member states

List of current observer states
Seven countries are observer states—a status that entitles them to express their opinion and give advice but denies them voting rights.   These are Eritrea, where Arabic is one of the official languages, as well as Brazil and Venezuela, which have large and influential Arab communities. India is another observer to the Arab League, with a sizable number of people claiming Arab descent. Armenia was granted observer status in 2004. Chad was granted observer status in 2005. Greece became an observer state in 2021.

Membership timeline

1942 – The United Kingdom promotes the idea of the Arab League.
1945 – Leaders of seven states in the Middle East sign the Alexandria Protocol, thus establishing the first Organization with a Pan-Arabic ideology in the 20th century. The founding members were Egypt, Iraq, Lebanon, Syria, Saudi Arabia, Jordan (entering under the name of Transjordan), and Yemen (which from 1967 was generally known under the name North Yemen).
1953 – Libya joins the Arab League two years after independence.
19 January 1956 – Sudan joins the Arab League, two weeks after independence from the United Kingdom and Egypt.
1 October 1958 – Morocco and Tunisia join the Arab League, two years after independence.
20 July 1961 – Kuwait joins the League 31 days after independence, and becomes the first Asian state to join the League after the founding states.
16 August 1962 – Algeria accedes to the Arab League, less than two months after independence.
1967 – South Yemen joins the Arab League upon its independence.
1971 – the United Arab Emirates, Oman, Qatar and Bahrain join the Arab League.
26 November 1973 – Mauritania joins the Arab League thirteen years after independence.
14 February 1974 – Somalia joins the Arab League fourteen years after independence.
9 September 1976 – Palestinian Liberation Organisation joins the Arab League. Its seat is assumed by the State of Palestine following the declaration of independence in 1988.
4 September 1977 – Djibouti joins the Arab League two months after its independence from France that same year.
26 March 1979 – Egypt suspended from the Arab League; readmitted on 23 May 1989.
22 May 1990 – North and South Yemen unify.
1993 – The Comoros accede to the Arab League.
January 2003 – Eritrea joins the Arab League as an observer.
2003 – Brazil joins the Arab League as an observer for one summit.
2004 – Armenia joins the Arab League as an observer.
April 2005 – Chad joins the Arab League as an observer.
September 2006 – Venezuela joins the Arab League as an observer for one summit.
April 2007 – India joins the Arab League as an observer state for the summit.
22 February 2011 – Libya suspended from the Arab League; readmitted on 25 August 2011.
July 2011 – South Sudan gains independence from Sudan, but does not join the Arab League.
16 November 2011 – Syria suspended from the Arab League.

Potential members and observers
Only one country where Arabic is an official language remains outside of the League: Chad.  In Malta, Eritrea and South Sudan, although Arabic is not an official language, a dialect of the language  is spoken by portions of the populations in these countries. Additionally, there are two other Arabic-speaking states with limited recognition – Sahrawi Arab Democratic Republic and Somaliland – but their disputed status, being claimed by League members Morocco and Somalia respectively, makes their membership unlikely for the foreseeable future.

Chad's membership was endorsed by the Egyptian government under Hosni Mubarak in 2010. Chad applied for membership on 25 March 2014. Arabic is one of its two official languages, some 12% of Chadians identifying as Arab and around 900,000 are Arabic-speaking. Chad has had observer status since 2005.

Eritrea applied for membership on 25 March 2014. To be considered for membership, Eritrea needs to improve its relations with other neighboring League members, including Djibouti, Sudan and Somalia. Eritrea has had observer status since 2003.

South Sudan declared its independence from League member state Sudan in July 2011. A clause in the Charter of the Arab League accords the right of territories that have seceded from an Arab League member state to join the organization. South Sudan  has been assured full membership in the Arab League should its government choose to seek it. Alternatively, the nation could opt for observer status. It has indicated that it would not be joining the League since the government believes it does not meet the pre-conditions for membership; specifically, that "the League requires that the countries must be Arabic speaking countries that consider Arabic language the main language of the nation; on top of that, the league also requires that the people of that particular country must believe that they are actually Arabs. The people of Southern Sudan are not of Arabic origin, so I don't think there will be anybody in Southern Sudan who will consider joining the Arab League". In an interview with Asharq Al-Awsat, the Foreign Minister of South Sudan Deng Alor Kuol said: South Sudan is the closest African country to the Arab world, and we speak a special kind of Arabic known as Juba Arabic. Sudan supports South Sudan’s request to join the Arab League. South Sudan applied for observer status in March 2018.

The Sahrawi Arab Democratic Republic is not a member though it is recognized by some Arab League states. Its status is disputed, its territory being claimed by League member Morocco, which makes its membership unlikely for the foreseeable future.

Latin America and the Caribbean is the home of a large, influential Arab population, mostly reside in Mexico, Honduras, Argentina, Venezuela, Brazil, Colombia, Uruguay, Chile, Panama, Ecuador, Jamaica, Haiti and Guatemala. However, these countries use Spanish, Portuguese, English and French as official languages, and have demonstrated little interests on joining the Arab League. Brazil and Venezuela are the only two observers in the League.

Suspensions
Egypt - Egypt's membership was suspended in March 1979 after it signed the Egypt–Israel peace treaty and the League's headquarters were moved from Cairo to Tunis. In 1987, Arab League states restored diplomatic relations with Egypt, the country was readmitted to the League in May 1989 and the League's headquarters were moved back to Cairo in September 1990.

Libya - Libya was suspended from the Arab League on 22 February 2011. On 27 August 2011, the Arab League voted to restore Libya's membership by accrediting a representative of the National Transitional Council, which was partially recognised as the interim government of the country in the wake of Gaddafi's ouster from the capital of Tripoli.

Libya's membership was suspended on 22 February 2011, following the start of the Libyan Civil War and the use of military force against civilians. That makes Libya the second country in the League's history to have a frozen membership. Libyan leader Muammar Gaddafi declared that the League was illegitimate, saying: "The Arab League is finished. There is no such thing as the Arab League". On 25 August 2011, Secretary-General Nabil Elaraby announced it was "about time" Libya's full member status was restored. The National Transitional Council, the partially recognised interim government of Libya, sent a representative to be seated at the Arab League meeting on 17 August to participate in a discussion as to whether to readmit Libya to the organisation.

Syria - On 20 September 2011, the Arab Parliament recommended suspension of Syria and Yemen over persistent reports of disproportionate violence against regime opponents and activists during the Arab Spring. On 12 November 2011, the League passed a decree that would suspend Ba'athist Syrian Arab Republic's membership if the government failed to stop violence against civilian protesters by 16 November 2011 amidst the uprising. Syria, Lebanon and Yemen voted against the motion, and Iraq abstained. Despite the opportunity, the Syrian government did not yield to the League's demands, resulting in its indefinite suspension. There was criticism after the Arab League sent in December 2011 a commission "monitoring" violence on people protesting against the regime. The commission was headed by Mohammad Ahmed Mustafa al-Dabi, who served as head of Omar al-Bashir's military intelligence, while war crimes, including genocide, were allegedly committed on his watch. On 6 March 2013, the Arab League granted to the Syrian National Coalition Syria's seat in the Arab League. On 9 March 2014, the League's secretary general Nabil al-Arabi said that Syria's seat at the Arab League would remain vacant until the opposition completes the formation of its institutions.

See also
 Member states of the Cooperation Council for the Arab States of the Gulf
 Organisation of Islamic Cooperation
 United Arab Command

References

 
Arab League, member states
Arab League, member states
Arab League, member states
Arab League, member states